International Mobile Telecommunications-2020 (IMT-2020 Standard) are the requirements issued by the ITU Radiocommunication Sector (ITU-R) of the International Telecommunication Union (ITU) in 2015 for 5G networks, devices and services.

On February 1, 2021, the standard was published as Recommendation ITU-R M.2150-0 titled Detailed specifications of the radio interfaces of IMT-2020, but most of it was finalized years earlier. For example the requirements for radio access technologies listed below were adopted in November 2017. Following the publication of the requirements the developers of radio access technologies such as 3GPP and ETSI are expected to develop 5G technologies meeting these requirements. 3GPP is developing radio access technologies 5G NR, LTE-M and NB-IoT that together are expected to meet all requirements,  while ETSI is developing DECT-2020 NR and Nufront is developing EUHT (Enhanced Ultra High Throughput).

Requirements 
The following parameters are the requirements for IMT-2020 5G candidate radio access technologies. Note that these requirements are not intended to restrict the full range of capabilities or performance that candidate for IMT-2020 might achieve, nor are they intended to describe how the technologies might perform in actual deployments.

References

External link 
 ITU-R Recommendation M.2150: Detailed specifications of the terrestrial radio interfaces of International Mobile Telecommunications-2020 (IMT-2020).
 at ITU

Mobile telecommunications standards
ITU-R recommendations